Ivan Joseph Flowers (21 February 1919 – 8 July 1944) was an English professional footballer who played in the Football League for Mansfield Town.

Personal life
Flowers served as a serjeant in the 7th Battalion, Royal Norfolk Regiment during the Second World War and was killed in Normandy on 8 July 1944. He is buried at Cambes-en-Plaine War Cemetery.

References

1919 births
1944 deaths
English footballers
Association football forwards
English Football League players
Wolverhampton Wanderers F.C. players
Mansfield Town F.C. players
Royal Norfolk Regiment soldiers
British Army personnel killed in World War II
Footballers from Suffolk